Maseng Station (MSG) is a class III railway station located at Warung Menteng, Cijeruk, Bogor Regency. The station, which is located at an altitude of +425 m, is included in the Operation Area I Jakarta.

Services 
The following is a list of train services at the Maseng Station.

Passenger services
 Mixed class

Incident 
This incident killed three people and caused the rail to hang which made the train impassable. As a result, the Pangrango train was forced to stop operating until the situation returned to normal.

References

External links

Bogor Regency
Railway stations in West Java
Railway stations opened in 1881